Niue competed in the 2014 Commonwealth Games in Glasgow, Scotland from 23 July to 3 August 2014. Niue participated in the Commonwealth Games for the fourth time, and has never previously won a medal. Niue's team consisted of 26 athletes in four sports.

Athletics

Men
Field events

Lawn bowls

Team Manager (Men's) - Mark Blumsky, Team Manager (Women's) - Pilena Motufoou, Coach - Ezra Talamahina.

Men

Women

Shooting

Men

Women

Weightlifting

Men

Women

References

Nations at the 2014 Commonwealth Games
Niue at the Commonwealth Games
Commonwealth Games